SGE may refer to:

 Sagitta, a constellation
 SGE, acronym of The School for Good and Evil, a book series
 SGE, IATA code for Siegerland Airport, Burbach, North Rhine-Westphalia, Germany
 Sigma Gamma Epsilon, honor society in earth sciences
 Sun Grid Engine, in computing, an open source batch-queuing system
 GM small gasoline engine, a family of engines produced by General Motors
 Sportgemeinde Eintracht, former name of Eintracht Frankfurt, a sports club and football team in Frankfurt, Hesse, Germany
 Sehr gut erhalten ("preserved very good"), German form of the "Very Good" coin grade
 Stitch's Great Escape!, a defunct theme park attraction at Magic Kingdom in Walt Disney World